The Spherical Tokamak Experiment is a machine dedicated to plasma studies in low aspect ratio tokamaks. The ETE was entirely designed and assembled at the Associated Plasma Laboratory (Laboratório Associado de Plasma, LAP) of Brazil's National Institute for Space Research (INPE).

Development 
The ETE is a spherical tokamak with major radius of 0.3 m and minor radius of 0.2 m. It began operations in late 2000.

References

Tokamaks